This article lists albums that were released or distributed by JIVE Records.

1980s

1981
 Tight Fit - Back to the 60's - JIVE HIP 1

1982
A Flock of Seagulls - A Flock of Seagulls - JIVE HOP 201
Tight Fit - Tight Fit - JIVE HIP 2
Zinc - Street Level - JIVE HOP 202
Willesden Dodgers - JIVE Rhythm Trax - JIVE HOP 203
Various Artists - Dangerous Dance Music - JIVE HOP 204
Q-Feel - Q-Feel - JIVE HOP 206
Willesden Dodgers - More JIVE Rhythm Trax - JIVE HOP 207

1983
 A Flock of Seagulls - Listen (Zomba) - JIVE HIP 4
Richard Jon Smith - Richard Jon Smith - JIVE HIP 5 
Willesden Dodgers - JIVE Scratch Trax - JIVE HIP 6
The Comsat Angels - Land - JIVE HIP 8
Various Artists - Turntable JIVE - JIVE HOP 208
Roman Holliday - Cookin' on the Roof - JIVE HIP 9
Whodini - Whodini - JIVE HIP 10

1984
The Group - I Hear I See I Learn - JIVE HOP 209 
Various Artists - Breakdance Fever - JIVE HOP 210 
Billy Ocean - Suddenly - JIVE HIP 12
A Flock of Seagulls - The Story of a Young Heart (JIVE/Arista) - JIVE HIP 14
Mama's Boys - Mama's Boys - JIVE HIP 15
Whodini - Escape - JIVE HIP 16
Sonny Okosun - Which Way Nigeria? - JIVE HIP 18

1985
Mama's Boys - Power and Passion - JIVE HIP 24
Hugh Masekela - Waiting for the Rain - JIVE HIP 25
Tangerine Dream - Le Parc - JIVE HIP 26
Jazzy Jeff - On Fire - JIVE HIP 27
Mark Shreeve - Legion - JIVE HIP 28
The Comsat Angels - 7 Day Weekend - JIVE HIP 29
Various Artists - Rap Attack - JIVE HOP 211
Jonathan Butler - Introducing Jonathan Butler - JIVE HIP 31
A Flock of Seagulls - Dream Come True -JIVE HIP 32 
Various Artists - The Jewel of the Nile: Music From The Motion Picture Soundtrack- JIVE HIP 33

1986
Billy Ocean - Love Zone - JIVE HIP 35
Ruby Turner - Women Hold Up Half the Sky - JIVE HIP 36
Precious Wilson - Precious Wilson - JIVE HIP 37
Whodini - Back in Black - JIVE HIP 38
Samantha Fox - Touch Me - JIVE HIP 39
A Flock Of Seagulls - The Best of A Flock of Seagulls - JIVE HIP 41
Schoolly D - Schoolly D
Schoolly D - Saturday Night! - The Album
Kool Moe Dee - Kool Moe Dee - JIVE HIP 44
Steady B - Bring the Beat Back - JIVE HIP 45

1987
Kool Moe Dee - How Ya Like Me Now HIP 53
Whodini - Open Sesame
Billy Ocean - Tear Down These Walls - JIVE HIP 57
Ruby Turner - The Motown Songbook - JIVE HIP 58
Glenn Jones - Glenn Jones
DJ Jazzy Jeff & The Fresh Prince - Rock the House
Steady B - What's My Name
 Samantha Fox - Samantha Fox - JIVE HIP 48
The Cat Club - One Last Kiss (JIVE 155)

1988
Too Short - Born to Mack
DJ Jazzy Jeff and the Fresh Prince - He's the DJ, I'm the Rapper
Schoolly D - Smoke Some Kill
Steady B - Let the Hustlers Play
Boogie Down Productions - By All Means Necessary
 Samantha Fox - I Wanna Have Some Fun - JIVE HIP 72
 Wee Papa Girl Rappers - The Beat, the Rhyme, the Noise - JIVE HIP 67

1989
Too Short - Life Is... Too Short
Schoolly D - Am I Black Enough for You?
DJ Jazzy Jeff and the Fresh Prince - And in This Corner...
Kool Moe Dee - Knowledge Is King
Steady B - Going Steady
Boogie Down Productions - Ghetto Music: The Blueprint of Hip Hop
Ruby Turner - Paradise - JIVE HIP 89
Tom Jones - At This Moment - TOMCD1

1990s

1990
Boogie Down Productions - Edutainment
D-Nice - Call Me D-Nice
A Tribe Called Quest - People's Instinctive Travels and the Paths of Rhythm
Too Short - Short Dog's in the House
Hi-Five - Hi-Five
Wee Papa Girl Rappers - Be Aware - JIVE HIP 103
Kool Rock Jay and the DJ Slice - Tales from the Dark Side
Kid Rock - Grits Sandwiches for Breakfast
Mr. Lee - Get Busy

1991
Samantha Fox - Just One Night
Kool Moe Dee - Funke Funke Wisdom
YOYOHONEY - Voodoo Soul
DJ Jazzy Jeff and the Fresh Prince - Homebase
A Tribe Called Quest - The Low End Theory
Steady B -  Steady B V

1992
R. Kelly and Public Announcement - Born into the 90's
Hi-Five - "Keep It Goin"
Too Short - Shorty the Pimp
Mr. Lee - I Wanna Rock Right Now

1993
R. Kelly - 12 Play
Souls of Mischief - 93 'til Infinity
A Tribe Called Quest - Midnight Marauders
Billy Ocean - Time to Move On
Too Short - Get in Where You Fit In
Shaquille O'Neal - Shaq Diesel
Spice 1  - 187 He Wrote
Smooth - You Been Played
DJ Jazzy Jeff and The Fresh Prince - Code Red

1994
 Keith Murray - The Most Beautifullest Thing in This World
Aaliyah - Age Ain't Nothing but a Number
Shaquille O'Neal - Shaq Fu: Da Return
Spice 1 - AmeriKKKa's Nightmare

1995
Mystikal - Mind of Mystikal
Insane Clown Posse - Riddle Box (Battery/Psychopathic)
Rednex - Sex & Violins (Battery)
R. Kelly - R. Kelly
Souls of Mischief - No Man's Land
Too Short - Cocktails
Smooth - Smooth

1996
Backstreet Boys - Backstreet Boys
 UGK - Ridin' Dirty

1997
Krs-One - I Got Next
Paradise Lost - One Second
D-Shot - Six Figures
Joe - All That I Am
Soundtrack - Booty Call
Mystikal - Unpredictable
Tupac Shakur - R U Still Down? (Remember Me)
Hed PE - Hed PE
Backstreet Boys - Backstreet's Back
Backstreet Boys - Backstreet Boys

1998
Spice 1 - Hits
Celly Cel - "G" Filez
E-40 - The Element of Surprise
Mystikal - Ghetto Fabulous
R. Kelly - R.
A Tribe Called Quest - The Love Movement
Ant Banks - Best of Ant Banks
DJ Jazzy Jeff & Fresh Prince - Greatest Hits
NSYNC - *NSYNC
Baby DC - School Dayz
Too Short - Nationwide "Independence Day"

1999
Too Short - Can't Stay Away
Keith Murray - It's a Beautiful Thing
Keith Murray - The Most Beautifullest Hits
Spice 1 - Immortalized
E-40 - Charlie Hustle: The Blueprint of a Self-Made Millionaire
Celly Cel - Best of Celly Cel
Various Artists - Sick Wid It's Greatest Hits
Imajin - Imajin
A Tribe Called Quest - The Anthology
Britney Spears - ...Baby One More Time
Backstreet Boys - Millennium
Steps The Videos (29 November 1999) (As Seen On Sky Box Office In 31 October 1999 – The 31 October Manchester show was broadcast live on Sky Box Office and later released on the video "The Next Step Live", which shows some backstage footage of the show.)

2000s

2000
*NSYNC - No Strings Attached
Joe - My Name Is Joe
Britney Spears - Oops!...I Did It Again
Aaron Carter - Aaron's Party (Come Get It)
R. Kelly - TP-2.com
Backstreet Boys - Black & Blue
Too Short - You Nasty
Mystikal - Let's Get Ready
E-40 - Loyalty And Betrayal

2001
*NSYNC - Celebrity
Aaron Carter - Oh Aaron
Backstreet Boys - The Hits: Chapter One
Britney Spears - Britney
Joe - Better Days
Too Short - Chase The Cat
Petey Pablo - Diary Of A Sinner: 1st Entry
Mystikal - Tarantula

2002
Richard Marx - Days in Avalon (Signal 21/JIVE) (Japanese release)
Justin Timberlake - Justified (Debut) (JIVE)
Aaron Carter- Another Earthquake
No Secrets - No Secrets
Too Short - What's My Favorite Word?
E-40 - The Ballitcian: Grit N Grind
R. Kelly & Jay-Z - The Best of Both Worlds
Jennifer Love Hewitt - BareNaked
Robyn - Don't Stop the Music
Nick Carter - Now or Never

2003
R. Kelly - Chocolate Factory
Britney Spears - In the Zone
Joe - And Then... 
Too Short - Married To The Game
E-40 - Breakin' News

2004
JC Chasez - Schizophrenic (JIVE/Zomba)
R. Kelly - Happy People/U Saved Me (JIVE/Zomba)
Britney Spears - Greatest Hits: My Prerogative (JIVE/Zomba)
Petey Pablo - Still Writing In My Diary: 2nd Entry

2005
Backstreet Boys - Never Gone (JIVE/Zomba)
R. Kelly - TP.3 Reloaded (JIVE/Zomba)
*NSYNC - Greatest Hits
Britney Spears - B in the Mix: The Remixes
Chris Brown - Chris Brown (JIVE/Zomba)

2006
Nick Lachey - What's Left of Me
Justin Timberlake - Future Sex/Love Sounds
Too Short - Blow the Whistle
Too Short - Mack of the Century: Greatest Hits
Aaron Carter - Come Get It: The Very Best of Aaron Carter
Aaron Carter - 2 Good 2 B True
Three Days Grace - One-X
Clipse - Hell Hath No Fury (JIVE/Star Trak/Re-Up)
Dirtie Blonde - Dirtie Blonde

2007
Joe - Ain't Nothin' Like Me
R. Kelly - Double Up
Backstreet Boys - Unbreakable
Britney Spears - Blackout (JIVE/Zomba)
The Pack - Based Boys (JIVE/Zomba)
Chris Brown - Exclusive (JIVE/Zomba)
Too Short - Get Off The Stage

2008
Bullet for My Valentine - Scream Aim Fire
Lil Mama - VYP (Voice of the Young People) (Familiar Mindz/JIVE)
Raheem DeVaughn - Love Behind the Melody
Usher - Here I Stand (LaFace/JIVE)
Britney Spears - Circus (JIVE/Zomba)
David Archuleta (JIVE/Zomba)
T-Pain - Thr33 Rings (Konvict Muzik/Nappy Boy/JIVE)

2009
Ciara - Fantasy Ride (LaFace/JIVE)
Jordin Sparks - Battlefield (JIVE/19/Zomba)
David Archuleta - Christmas from the Heart (JIVE/Zomba)
Britney Spears - The Singles Collection
Britney Spears - The Singles Collection (Box Set) (JIVE/Zomba)
Allison Iraheta - Just Like You (JIVE/Sony/19)
Three Days Grace - Life Starts Now
Kris Allen - Kris Allen
Backstreet Boys - This Is Us
R. Kelly - Untitled
Chris Brown - Graffiti

2010
Bullet for My Valentine - Fever
Buddy Guy - Living Proof
David Archuleta -The Other Side of Down (2010) (JIVE)
R. Kelly - Love Letter
Ciara - Basic Instinct (2010) (LaFace/JIVE)
Usher - Versus (EP)/Raymond v Raymond
Braxton Langston-Chapman - My Apologies (Apologies)
Backstreet Boys - Playlist: The Very Best of Backstreet Boys (JIVE/Legacy)
K. Michelle - What's The 901?
K. Michelle - For Colored Girls / Pre-Pain Medicine

2011
Trai'D - Trai'DMark (HiTz Committee/JIVE)
Chris Brown - F.A.M.E (2011) (JIVE/Zomba)
Britney Spears- Femme Fatale (JIVE/Zomba)
 NKOTBSB - NKOTBSB (Columbia/JIVE/Legacy)
K. Michelle - Signed, Sealed & Delivered

Unreleased albums
Crustified Dibbs - Night of the Bloody Apes
Britney Spears - The Original Doll
No Secrets - Friends Forever

References

Discographies of American record labels